Lone Vandborg (born 5 August 1961) is a Danish former professional tennis player.

Vandborg played Federation Cup tennis for Denmark in 1986 and 1987, appearing in a total of six ties. This included a World Group win over Great Britain, where Vandborg had a win over Anne Hobbs.

While competing on the professional circuit she was most successful as a doubles player, with a career high ranking of 185 and seven ITF titles to her name. She featured in the main draw of the women's doubles at the 1990 Australian Open.

ITF finals

Doubles: 13 (7–6)

References

External links
 
 
 

1961 births
Living people
Danish female tennis players
Sportspeople from Copenhagen